WNDV-FM (92.9 MHz, "U93") is a radio station broadcasting a Top 40/CHR format. The station serves the South Bend, Indiana area.

The station signed on in 1962 with the call letters WNDU-FM; it was owned by the University of Notre Dame (from which the call sign was derived), along with WNDU (1490 AM) and WNDU-TV (channel 16). In its early years, WNDU-FM simulcast the programming of its AM counterpart. In 1971, the station switched to the Drake-Chenault "Hit Parade" format. The station switched to its current Top 40 (CHR) format in 1979.  The station changed its call letters to WNDV-FM when it was sold by the university in 1998 to Artistic Media Partners.

References

External links
U93 official website

NDV-FM
Contemporary hit radio stations in the United States
Radio stations established in 1962
1962 establishments in Indiana